Jana Novotná and Arantxa Sánchez Vicario defeated the three-time defending champions Gigi Fernández and Natasha Zvereva in the final, 5–7, 7–5, 6–4 to win the ladies' doubles tennis title at the 1995 Wimbledon Championships.

Seeds

  Gigi Fernández /  Natasha Zvereva (final)
  Jana Novotná /  Arantxa Sánchez Vicario (champions)
  Steffi Graf /  Martina Navratilova (withdrew)
  Lindsay Davenport /  Lisa Raymond (first round)
  Meredith McGrath /  Larisa Neiland (semifinals)
  Patty Fendick /  Mary Joe Fernández (first round)
  Manon Bollegraf /  Rennae Stubbs (third round)
  Nicole Arendt /  Pam Shriver (quarterfinals)
  Gabriela Sabatini /  Brenda Schultz-McCarthy (semifinals)
  Julie Halard /  Nathalie Tauziat (third round)
  Conchita Martínez /  Patricia Tarabini (quarterfinals)
  Amanda Coetzer /  Inés Gorrochategui (second round)
  Elna Reinach /  Irina Spîrlea (third round)
  Katrina Adams /  Zina Garrison-Jackson (third round)
  Elena Makarova /  Eugenia Maniokova (first round)
  Linda Harvey-Wild /  Chanda Rubin (second round)
  Kristie Boogert /  Nicole Muns-Jagerman (third round)

Qualifying

Draw

Finals

Top half

Section 1

Section 2

Bottom half

Section 3

Section 4

References

External links

1995 Wimbledon Championships on WTAtennis.com
1995 Wimbledon Championships – Women's draws and results at the International Tennis Federation

Women's Doubles
Wimbledon Championship by year – Women's doubles